The Portrait of Vincenzo Anastagi is a portrait of Vincenzo Anastagi by El Greco, probably painted between 1571 and 1576, during the artist's time in Rome.

It is part of the Frick Collection, which acquired it in 1913.

References

Anastagi, Vincenzo
Anastagi
1570s paintings
Anastagi
Anastagi